Fishwick is a surname. It is from multiple locations in England, but predominantly from a place now in Preston, Lancashire; other origins are Fishwick in Kingsteignton, Devon, and possibly Fisherwick in Staffordshire. It may also derive from Fishwick in the Scottish Borders.

People with the surname 
Bert Fishwick (1899–1961), English footballer
Clifford Fishwick (1923–1997), English painter
Karen Fishwick, Scottish actor and musician
Marshall Fishwick (1923–2006), American scholar and writer
Harold Fishwick (born 1891, date of death unknown), English footballer
Tom Fishwick (1876–1950), English cricketer

See also 
 Fishwick, Preston, Lancashire, England, see Districts of Preston
 Fishwick, Scottish Borders, Scotland
 John Fishwick & Sons, a bus company
 Fyshwick, Australian Capital Territory, a suburb of Canberra, Australia

References 

English toponymic surnames
Scottish surnames
Toponymic surnames